The Democratic Independence Party, also called the Democratic Party for Independence, is a political party in Morocco.

History and profile
The Democratic Independence Party was established in 1946 by Mohamed Belhassan Wazzani. It was a splinter group from Istiqlal Party.

The party lost its 2 last seats at the 2007 elections.

References

1946 establishments in Morocco
Political parties established in 1946
Political parties in Morocco